WTNS-FM (99.3 FM) is a radio station  broadcasting an adult contemporary format. Licensed to Coshocton, Ohio, United States, the station is currently owned by Coshocton Broadcasting Co.

References

External links

TNS-FM